Hyun-jung, also spelled Hyun-jeong, or Hyeon-jung, Hyeon-jeong, Hyun-jong, Hyon-jong, Hyon-jeong is a Korean unisex given name, predominantly feminine. The meaning differs based on the hanja used to write each syllable of the name. There are 42 hanja with the reading "hyun" and 84 hanja with the reading "jung" on the South Korean government's official list of hanja which may be used in given names. Hyun-jung was the second-most popular name for baby girls born in South Korea in 1970, falling to tenth place by 1980.

People
People with this name include:

Entertainers
Go Hyun-jung (born 1971), South Korean actress
Kim Hyun-jung (born 1973), stage name Big Mama King, South Korean female jazz singer
Kim Hyun-jung (singer) (born 1976), South Korean female pop singer
Seola (singer) (born Kim Hyun-jung, 1994), South Korean singer and actress
Jo Hyeon-jeong (born 1979), South Korean voice actress
Vivian Cha (born Cha Hyun-jung, 1993), South Korean female fashion model
Eom Hyeon-jeong, South Korean voice actress
Niki Yang (Korean name Yang Hyun-jeong), South Korean animator and voice actress

Sportspeople
Woo Hyun-jung (born 1977), South Korean female field hockey player
Yang Hyun-jung (born 1977), South Korean male football coach
Joo Hyun-jung (born 1982), South Korean female archer
Na Hyun-jung (born 1990), South Korean female volleyball player
Kim Hyeon-jung (figure skater) (born 1992), South Korean figure skater
Chi Hyun-jung, South Korean female figure skater

See also
List of Korean given names

References

Korean unisex given names
Given names